Carpenter bees are species in the genus Xylocopa of the subfamily Xylocopinae. The genus includes some 500 bees in 31 subgenera. The common name "carpenter bee" derives from their nesting behavior; nearly all species burrow into hard plant material such as dead wood or bamboo. The main exceptions are species in the subgenus Proxylocopa; they dig nesting tunnels in suitable soil.

Etymology 
The French entomologist Pierre André Latreille described the genus in 1802. He derived the name from the Ancient Greek xylokopos/ξυλοκὀπος "wood-cutter".

Characteristics 

Many species in this enormous genus are difficult to tell apart; most species are all black, or primarily black with some yellow or white pubescence. Some differ only in subtle morphological features, such as details of the male genitalia. Males of some species differ confusingly from the females, being covered in greenish-yellow fur. The confusion of species arises particularly in the common names; in India, for example, the common name for any all-black species of Xylocopa is bhanvra (or bhomora - ভোমোৰা - in Assamese), and reports and sightings of bhanvra or bhomora are commonly misattributed to a European species, Xylocopa violacea; however, this species is found only in the northern regions of Jammu and Kashmir and Punjab, and most reports of bhanvra, especially elsewhere in India, refer to any of roughly 15 other common black Xylocopa species in the region, such as X. nasalis, X. tenuiscapa, or X. tranquebarorum.

Non-professionals commonly confuse carpenter bees with bumblebees; the simplest rule of thumb for telling them apart is that most carpenter bees have a shiny abdomen, whereas bumblebee abdomens are completely covered with dense hair. Males of some species of carpenter bees have a white or yellow face, unlike bumblebees, while females lack the bare corbicula of bumblebees; the hind leg is entirely hairy.

The wing venation is characteristic; the marginal cell in the front wing is narrow and elongated, and its apex bends away from the costa. The front wing has small stigma. When closed, the bee's short mandibles conceal the labrum. The clypeus is flat. Males of many species have much larger eyes than the females, which relates to their mating behavior.

In the United States, two eastern species, Xylocopa virginica and X. micans, occur. Three more species are primarily western in distribution, X. sonorina, X. tabaniformis orpifex, and X. californica. X. virginica is by far the more widely distributed species.

Ecological significance 
In several species, the females live alongside their own daughters or sisters, creating a small social group. They use wood bits to form partitions between the cells in the nest. A few species bore holes in wood dwellings. Since the tunnels are near the surface, structural damage is generally minor or superficial. However, carpenter bee nests are attractive to woodpeckers, which may do further damage by drilling into the wood to feed on the bees or larvae.

Carpenter bees have short mouthparts and are important pollinators on some open-faced or shallow flowers; for some they even are obligate pollinators, for example the maypop (Passiflora incarnata) and Orphium, which are not pollinated by any other insects. They also are important pollinators of flowers with various forms of lids, such as Salvia species and some members of the Fabaceae. However many carpenter bees "rob" nectar by slitting the sides of flowers with deep corollae.  Xylocopa virginica is one example of a species with such nectar robbing behavior.  With their short labia the bees cannot reach the nectar without piercing the long-tubed flowers; they miss contact with the anthers and perform no pollination. In some plants, this reduces fruit and seed production, while others have developed defence mechanisms against nectar robbing. When foraging for pollen from some species with tubular flowers however, the same species of carpenter bees still achieve pollination, if the anthers and stigmata are exposed together.
 
 
Many Old World carpenter bees have a special pouch-like structure on the inside of their first metasomal tergite called the acarinarium where certain mites (Dinogamasus species) reside as commensals. The exact nature of the relationship is not fully understood, though in other bees that carry mites, they are beneficial, feeding either on fungi in the nest, or on other harmful mites.

Behavior 

Carpenter bees are traditionally considered solitary bees, though some species have simple social nests in which mothers and daughters may cohabit. Examples of this type of social nesting can be seen in the species Xylocopa sulcatipes and Xylocopa nasalis. When females cohabit, a division of labor between them occurs sometimes. In this type of nesting, multiple females either share in the foraging and nest laying, or one female does all the foraging and nest laying, while the other females guard.

Solitary species differ from social species. Solitary bees tend to be gregarious and often several nests of solitary bees are near each other. In solitary nesting, the founding bee forages, builds cells, lays the eggs, and guards. Normally, only one generation of bees live in the nest. Xylocopa pubescens is one carpenter bee species that can have both social and solitary nests.

Carpenter bees make nests by tunneling into wood, bamboo, and similar hard plant material such as peduncles, usually dead. They vibrate their bodies as they rasp their mandibles against hard wood, each nest having a single entrance which may have many adjacent tunnels. As a subfamily, they nest in a wide range of host plants, but any one species may show definite adaptations or preferences for particular groups of plants. Carpenter bees do not eat wood. They discard the bits of wood, or reuse particles to build partitions between cells. The tunnel functions as a nursery for brood and storage for the pollen/nectar upon which the brood subsists. The provision masses of some species are among the most complex in shape of any group of bees; whereas most bees fill their brood cells with a soupy mass and others form simple spheroidal pollen masses, Xylocopa species form elongated and carefully sculpted masses that have several projections which keep the bulk of the mass from coming into contact with the cell walls, sometimes resembling an irregular caltrop. The eggs are very large relative to the size of the female, and are some of the largest eggs among all insects. Carpenter bees can be timber pests, and cause substantial damage to wood if infestations go undetected for several years.

Two very different mating systems appear to be common in carpenter bees, and often this can be determined simply by examining specimens of the males of any given species. Species in which the males have large eyes are characterized by a mating system where the males either search for females by patrolling, or by hovering and waiting for passing females, which they then pursue. In the other mating system, the males often have very small heads, but a large, hypertrophied glandular reservoir in the mesosoma releases pheromones into the airstream behind the male while it flies or hovers. The pheromone advertises the presence of the male to females.

Male bees often are seen hovering near nests, and will approach nearby animals. However, males are harmless, since they do not have a stinger. Female carpenter bees are capable of stinging, but they are docile and rarely sting unless caught in the hand or otherwise directly provoked.

Natural predators 
Woodpeckers eat carpenter bees, as do various species of birds, such as shrikes and bee-eaters as well as some mammals such as ratels. Other predators include large mantises and predatory flies, particularly large robber-flies of the family Asilidae. Woodpeckers are attracted to the noise of the bee larvae and drill holes along the tunnels to feed on them.

Apart from outright predators, parasitoidal species of bee flies (e.g. Xenox) lay eggs in the entrance to the bee’s nest and the fly maggots live off the bee larvae.

Species 

 Xylocopa abbotti (Cockerell, 1909)
 Xylocopa abbreviata Hurd & Moure, 1963
 Xylocopa acutipennis Smith, 1854
 Xylocopa adumbrata Lieftinck, 1957
 Xylocopa adusta Pérez, 1901
 Xylocopa aeneipennis (DeGeer, 1773)
 Xylocopa aerata (Smith, 1851)
 Xylocopa aestuans (Linnaeus, 1758)
 Xylocopa aethiopica Pérez, 1901
 Xylocopa africana (Fabricius, 1781)
 Xylocopa albiceps Fabricius, 1804
 Xylocopa albifrons Lepeletier, 1841
 Xylocopa albinotum Matsumura, 1926
 Xylocopa alternata Pérez, 1901
 Xylocopa alticola (Cockerell, 1919)
 Xylocopa amamensis Sonan, 1934
 Xylocopa amauroptera Pérez, 1901
 Xylocopa amazonica Enderlein, 1913
 Xylocopa amedaei Lepeletier, 1841
 Xylocopa amethystina (Fabricius, 1793)
 Xylocopa andarabana Hedicke, 1938
 Xylocopa andica Enderlein, 1913
 Xylocopa angulosa Maa, 1954
 Xylocopa anthophoroides Smith, 1874
 Xylocopa apicalis Smith, 1854
 Xylocopa appendiculata Smith, 1852
 Xylocopa artifex Smith, 1874
 Xylocopa aruana Ritsema, 1876
 Xylocopa assimilis Ritsema, 1880
 Xylocopa augusti Lepeletier, 1841
 Xylocopa auripennis Lepeletier, 1841
 Xylocopa aurorea Friese, 1922
 Xylocopa aurulenta (Fabricius, 1804)
 Xylocopa bakeriana (Cockerell, 1914)
 Xylocopa balteata Maa, 1943
 Xylocopa bambusae Schrottky, 1902
 Xylocopa bangkaensis Friese, 1903
 Xylocopa barbatella Cockerell, 1931
 Xylocopa bariwal Maidl, 1912
 Xylocopa basalis Smith, 1854
 Xylocopa bentoni Cockerell, 1919
 Xylocopa bequaerti (Cockerell, 1930)
 Xylocopa bhowara Maa, 1938
 Xylocopa biangulata Vachal, 1899
 Xylocopa bicarinata Alfken, 1932
 Xylocopa bicristata Maa, 1954
 Xylocopa bilineata Friese, 1914
 Xylocopa bimaculata Friese, 1903
 Xylocopa binongkona van der Vecht, 1953
 Xylocopa bluethgeni Dusmet y Alonso, 1924
 Xylocopa bombiformis Smith, 1874
 Xylocopa bomboides Smith, 1879
 Xylocopa bombylans (Fabricius, 1775)
 Xylocopa boops Maidl, 1912
 Xylocopa bouyssoui Vachal, 1898
 Xylocopa brasilianorum (Linnaeus, 1767)
 Xylocopa braunsi Dusmet y Alonso, 1924
 Xylocopa bruesi Cockerell, 1914
 Xylocopa bryorum (Fabricius, 1775)
 Xylocopa buginesica Vecht, 1953
 Xylocopa buruana Lieftinck, 1956
 Xylocopa caerulea (Fabricius, 1804)
 Xylocopa caffra (Linnaeus, 1767)
 Xylocopa calcarata (LeVeque, 1928)
 Xylocopa calens Lepeletier, 1841
 Xylocopa californica Cresson, 1864
 Xylocopa caloptera Pérez, 1901
 Xylocopa canaria (Cockerell & LeVeque, 1925)
 Xylocopa cantabrita Lepeletier, 1841
 Xylocopa capensis Spinola, 1838
 Xylocopa capitata Smith, 1854
 Xylocopa carbonaria Smith, 1854
 Xylocopa caribea Lepeletier, 1841
 Xylocopa caspari van der Vecht, 1953
 Xylocopa caviventris Maidl, 1912
 Xylocopa cearensis Ducke, 1911
 Xylocopa ceballosi Dusmet y Alonso, 1924
 Xylocopa celebensis (Gribodo, 1894)
 Xylocopa chapini (LeVeque, 1928)
 Xylocopa chinensis Friese, 1911
 Xylocopa chiyakensis (Cockerell, 1908)
 Xylocopa chlorina (Cockerell, 1915)
 Xylocopa chrysopoda Schrottky, 1902
 Xylocopa chrysoptera Latreille, 1809
 Xylocopa ciliata Burmeister, 1876
 Xylocopa citrina Friese, 1909
 Xylocopa clarionensis Hurd, 1958
 Xylocopa claripennis Friese, 1922
 Xylocopa cloti Vachal, 1898
 Xylocopa cockerelli Maa, 1943
 Xylocopa codinai Dusmet y Alonso, 1924
 Xylocopa colona Lepeletier, 1841
 Xylocopa columbiensis Pérez, 1901
 Xylocopa combinata Ritsema, 1876
 Xylocopa combusta Smith, 1854
 Xylocopa concolorata Maa, 1938
 Xylocopa conradsiana Friese, 1911
 Xylocopa coracina van der Vecht, 1953
 Xylocopa cornigera Friese, 1909
 Xylocopa coronata Smith, 1861
 Xylocopa cribrata Pérez, 1901
 Xylocopa cubaecola Lucas, 1857
 Xylocopa cuernosensis (Cockerell, 1915)
 Xylocopa cyanea Smith, 1874
 Xylocopa cyanescens Brullé, 1832
 Xylocopa dalbertisi Lieftinck, 1957
 Xylocopa dapitanensis (Cockerell, 1915)
 Xylocopa darwini Cockerell, 1926
 Xylocopa dejeanii Lepeletier, 1841
 Xylocopa dibongoana Hedicke, 1923
 Xylocopa dimidiata Latreille, 1809
 Xylocopa disconota Friese, 1914
 Xylocopa distinguenda Pérez, 1901
 Xylocopa ditypa Vachal, 1898
 Xylocopa diversipes Smith, 1861
 Xylocopa dolosa Vachal, 1899
 Xylocopa dormeyeri (Enderlein, 1909)
 Xylocopa duala Strand, 1921
 Xylocopa electa Smith, 1874
 Xylocopa elegans Hurd & Moure, 1963
 Xylocopa erlangeri Enderlein, 1903
 Xylocopa erythrina Gribodo, 1894
 Xylocopa escalerai Dusmet y Alonso, 1924
 Xylocopa esica Cameron, 1902
 Xylocopa euchlora Pérez, 1901
 Xylocopa euxantha Cockerell, 1933
 Xylocopa eximia Pérez, 1901
 Xylocopa fabriciana Moure, 1960
 Xylocopa fallax Maidl, 1912
 Xylocopa fenestrata (Fabricius, 1798)
 Xylocopa fervens Lepeletier, 1841
 Xylocopa fimbriata Fabricius, 1804
 Xylocopa flavicollis (DeGeer, 1778)
 Xylocopa flavifrons Matsumura, 1912
 Xylocopa flavonigrescens Smith, 1854
 Xylocopa flavorufa (DeGeer, 1778)
 Xylocopa forbesii W. F. Kirby, 1883
 Xylocopa forsiusi Dusmet y Alonso, 1924
 Xylocopa fortissima Cockerell, 1930
 Xylocopa fransseni van der Vecht, 1953
 Xylocopa friesiana Maa, 1939
 Xylocopa frontalis (Olivier, 1789)
 Xylocopa fuliginata Pérez, 1901
 Xylocopa fulva Friese, 1922
 Xylocopa funesta Maidl, 1912
 Xylocopa fuscata Smith, 1854
 Xylocopa gabonica (Gribodo, 1894)
 Xylocopa ganglbaueri Maidl, 1912
 Xylocopa gaullei Vachal, 1898
 Xylocopa ghilianii Gribodo, 1891
 Xylocopa gracilis Dusmet y Alonso, 1923
 Xylocopa graueri Maidl, 1912
 Xylocopa gressitti Lieftinck, 1957
 Xylocopa gribodoi Magretti, 1892
 Xylocopa grisescens Lepeletier, 1841
 Xylocopa grossa (Drury, 1770)
 Xylocopa grubaueri Friese, 1903
 Xylocopa gualanensis Cockerell, 1912
 Xylocopa guatemalensis Cockerell, 1912
 Xylocopa guigliae Lieftinck, 1957
 Xylocopa haefligeri Friese, 1909
 Xylocopa haematospila Moure, 1951
 Xylocopa hafizii Maa, 1938
 Xylocopa hellenica Spinola, 1843
 Xylocopa hirsutissima Maidl, 1912
 Xylocopa hottentotta Smith, 1854
 Xylocopa hyalinipennis Friese, 1922
 Xylocopa ignescens (LeVeque, 1928)
 Xylocopa imitator Smith, 1854
 Xylocopa incandescens (Cockerell, 1932)
 Xylocopa incerta Pérez, 1901
 Xylocopa incompleta Ritsema, 1880
 Xylocopa inconspicua Maa, 1937
 Xylocopa inconstans Smith, 1874
 Xylocopa inquirenda Vachal, 1899
 Xylocopa insola Vachal, 1910
 Xylocopa insularis Smith, 1857
 Xylocopa io Vachal, 1898
 Xylocopa iranica Maa, 1954
 Xylocopa iridipennis Lepeletier, 1841
 Xylocopa iris (Christ, 1791)
 Xylocopa isabelleae Hurd, 1959
 Xylocopa javana Friese, 1914
 Xylocopa kamerunensis Vachal, 1899
 Xylocopa karnyi Maidl, 1912
 Xylocopa kerri (Cockerell, 1929)
 Xylocopa kuehni Friese, 1903
 Xylocopa lachnea Moure, 1951
 Xylocopa lanata Smith, 1854
 Xylocopa langi (LeVeque, 1928)
 Xylocopa lateralis Say, 1837
 Xylocopa lateritia Smith, 1854
 Xylocopa laticeps
 Xylocopa latipes (Drury, 1773)
 Xylocopa lautipennis (Cockerell, 1933)
 Xylocopa lehmanni Friese, 1903
 Xylocopa lepeletieri Enderlein, 1903
 Xylocopa leucocephala Ritsema, 1876
 Xylocopa leucothoracoides Maidl, 1912
 Xylocopa levequeae Maa, 1943
 Xylocopa lieftincki Leys, 2000
 Xylocopa lombokensis Maidl, 1912
 Xylocopa longespinosa Enderlein, 1903
 Xylocopa longula Friese, 1922
 Xylocopa loripes Smith, 1874
 Xylocopa lucbanensis (Cockerell, 1927)
 Xylocopa lucida Smith, 1874
 Xylocopa lugubris Gerstäcker, 1857
 Xylocopa lundqvisti Lieftinck, 1957
 Xylocopa luteola Lepeletier, 1841
 Xylocopa macrops Lepeletier, 1841
 Xylocopa madida Friese, 1925
 Xylocopa madurensis Friese, 1913
 Xylocopa maesoi Dusmet y Alonso, 1924
 Xylocopa magnifica (Cockerell, 1929)
 Xylocopa maidli Maa, 1940
 Xylocopa maior Maidl, 1912
 Xylocopa marginella Lepeletier, 1841
 Xylocopa mastrucata Pérez, 1901
 Xylocopa mazarredoi Dusmet y Alonso, 1924
 Xylocopa mcgregori Cockerell, 1920
 Xylocopa mckeani (Cockerell, 1929)
 Xylocopa meadewaldoi Hurd, 1959
 Xylocopa mendozana Enderlein, 1913
 Xylocopa merceti Dusmet y Alonso, 1924
 Xylocopa metallica Smith, 1874
 Xylocopa mexicanorum Cockerell, 1912
 Xylocopa meyeri Dusmet y Alonso, 1924
 Xylocopa micans Lepeletier, 1841
 Xylocopa micheneri Hurd, 1978
 Xylocopa mimetica Cockerell, 1915
 Xylocopa minor Maidl, 1912
 Xylocopa mirabilis Hurd & Moure, 1963
 Xylocopa mixta Radoszkowski, 1881
 Xylocopa modesta Smith, 1854
 Xylocopa mohnikei Cockerell, 1907
 Xylocopa mongolicus (Wu, 1983)
 Xylocopa montana Enderlein, 1903
 Xylocopa mordax Smith, 1874
 Xylocopa morotaiana Lieftinck, 1956
 Xylocopa muscaria (Fabricius, 1775)
 Xylocopa myops Ritsema, 1876
 Xylocopa nasalis Westwood, 1842
 Xylocopa nasica Pérez, 1901
 Xylocopa nautlana Cockerell, 1904
 Xylocopa negligenda Maa, 1939
 Xylocopa nigrella Hurd, 1959
 Xylocopa nigrescens Friese, 1901
 Xylocopa nigricans Vachal, 1910
 Xylocopa nigricaula (LeVeque, 1928)
 Xylocopa nigripes Friese, 1915
 Xylocopa nigrita (Fabricius, 1775)
 Xylocopa nigrocaerulea Smith, 1874
 Xylocopa nigrocaudata Pérez, 1901
 Xylocopa nigrocincta Smith, 1854
 Xylocopa nigroclypeata Rayment, 1935
 Xylocopa nigroplagiata Ritsema, 1876
 Xylocopa nigrotarsata Maa, 1938
 Xylocopa nitidiventris Smith, 1878
 Xylocopa nix (Maa, 1954)
 Xylocopa nobilis Smith, 1859
 Xylocopa nogueirai Hurd & Moure, 1960
 Xylocopa nyassica Enderlein, 1903
 Xylocopa oblonga Smith, 1874
 Xylocopa obscurata Smith, 1854
 Xylocopa obscuritarsis Friese, 1922
 Xylocopa occipitalis Pérez, 1901
 Xylocopa ocellaris Pérez, 1901
 Xylocopa ocularis Pérez, 1901
 Xylocopa ogasawarensis Matsumura, 1932
 Xylocopa olivacea (Fabricius, 1778)
 Xylocopa olivieri Lepeletier, 1841
 Xylocopa ordinaria Smith, 1874
 Xylocopa ornata Smith, 1874
 Xylocopa orthogonaspis Moure, 2003
 Xylocopa orthosiphonis (Cockerell, 1908)
 Xylocopa pallidiscopa Hurd, 1961
 Xylocopa parviceps Morawitz, 1895
 Xylocopa parvula Rayment, 1935
 Xylocopa perforator Smith, 1861
 Xylocopa perkinsi Cameron, 1901
 Xylocopa perpunctata (LeVeque, 1928)
 Xylocopa peruana Pérez, 1901
 Xylocopa perversa Wiedemann, 1824
 Xylocopa pervirescens Cockerell, 1931
 Xylocopa phalothorax Lepeletier, 1841
 Xylocopa philippinensis Smith, 1854
 Xylocopa pilosa Friese, 1922
 Xylocopa plagioxantha Lieftinck, 1964
 Xylocopa praeusta Smith, 1854
 Xylocopa prashadi Maa, 1938
 Xylocopa preussi Enderlein, 1903
 Xylocopa provida Smith, 1863
 Xylocopa proximata Maa, 1938
 Xylocopa przewalskyi Morawitz, 1886
 Xylocopa pseudoleucothorax Maidl, 1912
 Xylocopa pseudoviolacea Popov, 1947
 Xylocopa pubescens Spinola, 1838
 Xylocopa pulchra Smith, 1874
 Xylocopa punctifrons Cockerell, 1917
 Xylocopa punctigena Maa, 1938
 Xylocopa punctilabris Morawitz, 1894
 Xylocopa pusulata Vachal, 1910
 Xylocopa ramakrishnai Maa, 1938
 Xylocopa rejecta Vachal, 1910
 Xylocopa remota Maa, 1938
 Xylocopa rogenhoferi Friese, 1900
 Xylocopa rotundiceps Smith, 1874
 Xylocopa rufa Friese, 1901
 Xylocopa ruficeps Friese, 1910
 Xylocopa ruficollis Hurd & Moure, 1963
 Xylocopa ruficornis Fabricius, 1804
 Xylocopa rufidorsum Enderlein, 1913
 Xylocopa rufipes Smith, 1852
 Xylocopa rufitarsis Lepeletier, 1841
 Xylocopa rutilans Lieftinck, 1957
 Xylocopa samarensis (Cockerell & LeVeque, 1925)
 Xylocopa sarawatica Engel, 2017
 Xylocopa schoana Enderlein, 1903
 Xylocopa scioensis Gribodo, 1884
 Xylocopa senex Friese, 1909
 Xylocopa senior Vachal, 1899
 Xylocopa shelfordi Cameron, 1902
 Xylocopa sicheli Vachal, 1898
 Xylocopa signata Morawitz, 1875
 Xylocopa similis Smith, 1874
 Xylocopa simillima Smith, 1854
 Xylocopa sinensis (Wu, 1983)
 Xylocopa sinensis Smith, 1854
 Xylocopa smithii Ritsema, 1876
 Xylocopa sogdiana Popov & Ponomareva, 1961
 Xylocopa somalica Magretti, 1895
 Xylocopa sonorina Smith, 1874
 Xylocopa sphinx Vachal, 1899
 Xylocopa splendidula Lepeletier, 1841
 Xylocopa stadelmanni Vachal, 1899
 Xylocopa stanleyi (LeVeque, 1928)
 Xylocopa steindachneri Maidl, 1912
 Xylocopa strandi Dusmet y Alonso, 1924
 Xylocopa subcombusta (LeVeque, 1928)
 Xylocopa subcyanea Pérez, 1901
 Xylocopa subjuncta Vachal, 1898
 Xylocopa subvirescens Cresson, 1879
 Xylocopa subvolatilis (Cockerell, 1918)
 Xylocopa subzonata Moure, 1949
 Xylocopa sulcatipes Maa, 1970
 Xylocopa sulcifrons Pérez, 1901
 Xylocopa suspecta Moure & Camargo, 1988
 Xylocopa suspiciosa Vachal, 1899
 Xylocopa sycophanta Pérez, 1901
 Xylocopa tabaniformis Smith, 1854
 Xylocopa tacanensis Moure, 1949
 Xylocopa tambelanensis (Cockerell, 1926)
 Xylocopa tanganyikae Strand, 1911
 Xylocopa tayabanica Cockerell, 1930
 Xylocopa tegulata Friese, 1911
 Xylocopa tenkeana Cockerell, 1933
 Xylocopa tenuata Smith, 1874
 Xylocopa tenuiscapa Westwood, 1840
 Xylocopa teredo Guilding, 1825
 Xylocopa tesselata Maa, 1970
 Xylocopa thoracica Friese, 1903
 Xylocopa togoensis Enderlein, 1903
 Xylocopa torrida (Westwood, 1838)
 Xylocopa tranquebarica (Fabricius, 1804)
 Xylocopa tranquebarorum (Swederus, 1787)
 Xylocopa transitoria Pérez, 1901
 Xylocopa tricolor Ritsema, 1876
 Xylocopa trifasciata Gribodo, 1891
 Xylocopa trochanterica Vachal, 1910
 Xylocopa truxali Hurd & Moure, 1963
 Xylocopa tumida Friese, 1903
 Xylocopa tumorifera Lieftinck, 1957
 Xylocopa turanica Morawitz, 1875
 Xylocopa uclesiensis Pérez, 1901
 Xylocopa unicolor Smith, 1861
 Xylocopa ustulata Smith, 1854
 Xylocopa vachali Pérez, 1901
 Xylocopa valga Gerstäcker, 1872
 Xylocopa varentzowi Morawitz, 1895
 Xylocopa varians Smith, 1874
 Xylocopa varipes Smith, 1854
 Xylocopa velutina Lieftinck, 1957
 Xylocopa versicolor Alfken, 1930
 Xylocopa vestita Hurd & Moure, 1963
 Xylocopa villosa Friese, 1909
 Xylocopa violacea (Linnaeus, 1758)
 Xylocopa virginica (Linnaeus, 1771)
 Xylocopa viridigastra Lepeletier, 1841
 Xylocopa viridis Smith, 1854
 Xylocopa vittata Enderlein, 1903
 Xylocopa vogtiana Enderlein, 1913
 Xylocopa volatilis Smith, 1861
 Xylocopa vulpina Alfken, 1930
 Xylocopa waterhousei Leys, 2000
 Xylocopa watmoughi Eardley, 1983
 Xylocopa wellmani Cockerell, 1906
 Xylocopa wilmattae Cockerell, 1912
 Xylocopa xanti Mocsáry, 1883
 Xylocopa yunnanensis Wu, 1982
 Xylocopa zonata Alfken, 1930

Gallery

References

External links 

United States Xylocopa Identification Guide
List of Species
Worldwide Species Map
 Close-up photos of a carpenter bee – taken near the town of Chavarillo, Veracruz, Mexico
Carpenter bees, Xylocopa spp. on the UF / IFAS Featured Creatures Web site

Xylocopinae

Articles containing video clips